Scott Christopher Redding (born 4 January 1993) is a British motorcycle racer. For 2022 he is contracted to ride in Superbike World Championship with BMW Motorrad WorldSBK team after the 2020 and 2021 seasons with Ducati factory WSBK team riding a Panigale V4. 

In 2019, he competed in the British Superbike Championship riding a Ducati Panigale V4 for Paul Bird's PBM team, winning the championship on his first attempt. 

He is known for competing in Grand Prix motorcycle racing, primarily in the premier MotoGP class from 2014 to 2018. He was the youngest rider in Grand Prix motorcycle racing to win a race, breaking Marco Melandri's ten-year record, until Can Öncü broke this record in 2018.

Career

Early career
Born in Quedgeley, Gloucester, Redding started racing Mini Motos in 2001, winning the 2004 FAB-Racing Metrakit 50cc British MiniGP championship and then switching to the 80cc Metrakit "Calypso Cup" in 2005 in Spain, where he won all six rounds of the series.

In 2006 he tested for the Red Bull sponsored MotoGP academy cup and was immediately offered a ride. However he had a mixed season with only one podium finish at the last round in Jerez.

For 2007 he signed for team BLU:sens Aprilia riding in the Spanish CEV 125cc championship finishing second overall to Stefan Bradl with a difference of eight points, taking a second place at round four and winning at the final rounds of five, six and seven.

125cc World Championship (2008–2009)
Redding left the CEV championship in 2008, being entered by team BLU:sens Aprilia in the 125cc Grand Prix World championship.
Redding made a sensational start at the opening round of Qatar, by being the youngest ever rider in the 125cc class to qualify on the front row of the grid, in fourth place. He went on to take fifth place in the race setting the lap record for the 125cc class of 2'05.635 in the process. He was also on the front row in Spain.

On 22 June 2008 Redding became the back then youngest ever Grand Prix winner, aged 15 years and 170 days, when he won the 2008 British 125cc Grand Prix at Donington Park. Redding took the lead with six laps remaining after pressuring Andrea Iannone into pushing too hard and going off at Craner Curves. Redding held off Frenchman Mike Di Meglio and Spaniard Marc Márquez to win in only his eighth 125cc outing. He became the first British winner of a 125cc race since Chas Mortimer won the 1975 Spanish Grand Prix and the first British winner of a British motorcycle Grand Prix in the 125cc class since 1973, when Tommy Robb won at the 1973 Isle of Man TT, which was then the British round of the world championship. He is also the first British rider ever to win a British round of any Grand Prix class since the British motorcycle Grand Prix moved to Donington Park in 1987. In the first ever two-wheeled race at the famous Indianapolis Motor Speedway in America, Redding secured 4th place, having been in that position when it started to rain due to Hurricane Ike and Red Flag brought the race to a premature end.

Redding also won Rookie of the Year for being the highest placed new rider, finishing the season in eleventh overall.

For the 2009 125cc Motorcycle Grand Prix season Redding rode a factory Aprilia machinery and remained with team BLU:sens Aprilia.

Redding had a difficult season, suffering from mechanical issues and handling difficulties. He got on the podium at the 2009 British Grand Prix, his second career podium.

Moto2 World Championship (2010–2013)

Marc VDS Racing Team (2010–2013)

2010 

Redding signed with new team Marc VDS Racing Team in the Moto2 600cc class for 2010, having grown too big to continue competing in the 125cc class. He struggled in the initial pre-season tests, but was more competitive in later ones. Redding struggled at the beginning of the season, but improved to finish fourth in the British Grand Prix at Silverstone and became the youngest rider ever to score a podium finish in the 250cc/Moto2 class by finishing third in Indianapolis.

At the San Marino Grand Prix in Misano, Redding was involved in an accident which resulted in the death of Japanese rider Shoya Tomizawa. After Tomizawa fell from his bike on the twelfth lap of the race, he was immediately hit by Redding and Alex de Angelis, who were unable to avoid him. Redding received ten stitches for a back laceration but escaped major injury.

On 29 September 2010, Redding signed a two-year contract with Marc VDS, keeping him in Moto2 until .

2011 
Redding finished the season in 15th place with 63 points, with a best result of fifth place, obtained on three occasions: at Silverstone, Indianapolis and Misano.

2012 
Redding finished the season in fifth position, having collected 165 points, a second place in the 2012 British motorcycle Grand Prix, his home race, along with four other podiums, all third places finishes.

2013 
Riding again for Marc VDS, Redding finished a close second in the championship after a season-long battle against Pol Espargaró. During the season, Redding obtained three victories, three second places, a third place, and three pole-positions.  With three races left in the season he held a lead of 10 points over Espargaró; however, Redding crashed during qualifying in Australia, fracturing his wrist and could not participate in the race. Pol Espargaró won the race. In the following Japanese Grand Prix, Redding collided with the motorcycle of Esteve Rabat who had crashed in front of him in the second turn of the race. The race was red-flagged and restarted without an injured Redding; this second incident took him out of contention for the title, which Espargaró won by winning the Japanese race too.

MotoGP World Championship (2014–2018)

GO&FUN Gresini Honda (2014)

2014 

Redding switched to MotoGP with the GO & FUN Gresini team on a Honda RCV1000R production racer, his teammate was Álvaro Bautista. He was consistent over the year, finishing every race except Austin. His best results of the season were two seventh-place finishes, at the season-opening round in Qatar and at Phillip Island. He finished 12th in the championship, scoring 81 points. He was also runner-up in the "open class" category, albeit 45 points behind Aleix Espargaró.

EG 0,0 Marc VDS (2015)

2015 
In 2015 Redding remained in MotoGP, re-joining his former team Marc VDS. He was riding a factory-specification Honda RC213V. At the San Marino Grand Prix, Redding achieved his maiden MotoGP podium with a third-place finish despite crashing early in the race. On 30 August 2015, the morning of his home race at Silverstone, it was announced that Redding would join Pramac Racing for the  season, replacing Yonny Hernández alongside Danilo Petrucci.

Pramac Racing (2016–2017)

2016 
Scott Redding remained in MotoGP for his third season, this time racing for Pramac Racing, his third team in three seasons. Riding on a Ducati Desmosedici GP15,  with fellow teammate Danilo Petrucci, Scott Redding had a mixed season. He only finished 15th in the standings, one point behind Petrucci, but he managed to get his second, and to date his last, MotoGP podium at the 2016 Dutch TT.

2017 
In 2017, Redding stayed with Pramac Racing Ducati, together with Danilo Petrucci. However, due to last years performances, Danilo Petrucci received a GP17 Ducati Desmosedici with factory support while Redding had to do with the GP16. During this year, Petrucci emerged as the far stronger rider with Redding never finishing higher than seventh in both Qatar and San Marino. In turn, this would be his last year with Pramac Racing.

Aprilia Racing Team Gresini (2018)

2018 
After his contract at Ducati was not extended, Redding signed with Aprilia for the 2018 season. He replaced fellow british rider Sam Lowes, who had a catastrophic 2017 season, finishing with just 5 points, compared to teammate Aleix Espargaró's 62. The 2018 season did not go as planned for Aprilia however, Espargaró finished with 44 points, and a best result of 6th in Aragon, while Redding finished with 20 points, and not having a top 10 finish all year. Following the season, Redding was not re-signed by the team.

After MotoGP

British Superbike Championship (2019)

2019 
In 2019, he competed in the British Superbike Championship riding a Ducati Panigale V4 for Paul Bird's PBM team. He won the championship on his first attempt, after an epic showdown with his teammate Josh Brookes, Redding edging him out by a mere 5 points, over a 27 race season.

Superbike World Championship (2020–present)

2020 
For 2020, Redding competed in the Superbike World Championship, signing a two-year deal to ride a factory Ducati Panigale V4 for the Aruba.it Racing team. He had a successful first season, finishing on the podium 13 times in 24 races (5 times first, 5 times second, 3 times in third place), and finished second overall in the standings.

2021 
As of late season 2021, Redding already has 6 victories, 9 second place finishes, 4 third place finishes, and is third in the standings currently. In August, he and BMW announced that Redding would switch from Ducati to BMW for 2022, a move that surprised many people.

Career statistics

Grand Prix motorcycle racing

By season

By class

Races by year
(key) (Races in bold indicate pole position; races in italics indicate fastest lap)

British Superbike Championship

Races by year
(key) (Races in bold indicate pole position; races in italics indicate fastest lap)

Superbike World Championship

Races by year
(key) (Races in bold indicate pole position; races in italics indicate fastest lap)

References

External links

 

1993 births
Living people
British motorcycle racers
English motorcycle racers
125cc World Championship riders
Moto2 World Championship riders
Pramac Racing MotoGP riders
Gresini Racing MotoGP riders
Marc VDS Racing Team MotoGP riders
People from Stroud District
MotoGP World Championship riders
Superbike World Championship riders